Year 1033 (MXXXIII) was a common year starting on Monday (the wikilink will display the full calendar) of the Julian calendar.

Events 
 By place 

 Asia 
 December 5 – A major earthquake in the Jordan Valley devastates multiple cities across the Palestine region, killing many people and triggering a tsunami.

 Europe 
 February 2 – Emperor Conrad II (the Elder) holds an assembly at the Abbey of Payerne and is crowned King of Burgundy. He claims dominion over the Kingdom of Burgundy which is incorporated into the Holy Roman Empire.
 Treaty of Merseburg: Conrad II attends a Hoftag at Merseburg and signs an agreement with King Mieszko II. He divides Poland in three parts with Mieszko designated as supreme ruler, in exchange for Conrad's support. 

 By topic 

 Religion 
 Panic spreads throughout Europe that the end of the universe may be near, on the supposed 1,000th anniversary of the crucifixion of Christ, due to some unusually harsh spring weather. The Book of Revelation (Chapter 20) predicts the end of the earth after a 1,000 year period after the second return of Jesus Christ.

Births 
 Anselm, English archbishop and philosopher (d. 1109)
 Cheng Yi, Chinese neo-confucian philosopher (d. 1107)
 Conan II, duke of Brittany (approximate date)
 Fujiwara no Atsuie, Japanese nobleman (d. 1090)
 Fujiwara no Tadaie, Japanese statesman (d. 1091)
 Judith of Flanders, German duchess (approximate date)
 Theobald of Provins, French hermit and saint (d. 1066)
 Urraca of Zamora, Spanish noblewoman (d. 1101)

Deaths 
 May 11 – Ebles I, French nobleman and archbishop
 Abu Talib Yahya, Muslim imam (Zaidiyyah sect) (b. 951)
 Ahmad Inaltigin, Ghaznavid general and rebel leader
 Ibno Al-Thahabi, Moorish encyclopedist and physician
 John VIII bar Abdoun, patriarch of Antioch (b. 944)
 Liu, empress and regent of the Song Dynasty (b. 969)
 Merewith (or Beorhtwig), English abbot and bishop
 Otto Bolesławowic, Polish prince (House of Piast) (b. 1000)
 Rhydderch ap Iestyn, king of Gwent and Deheubarth

References